A ruby is a red gemstone.

Ruby may also refer to:

Places
 Ruby, Alaska
 Ruby, Arizona
 Ruby, Copiah County, Mississippi
 Ruby, Leflore County, Mississippi
 Ruby, Nebraska
 Ruby, New York
 Ruby, South Carolina
 Ruby, United States Virgin Islands
 Ruby, Virginia
 Ruby, Washington, a ghost town
 Ruby, Wisconsin, a town
 Ruby (community), Wisconsin, an unincorporated community
 Ruby Beach, Washington
 Ruby Canyon, on the Colorado-Utah border
 Ruby Creek (disambiguation)
 Ruby Falls, an underground waterfall within Lookout Mountain, Tennessee
 Ruby Mountain, a stratovolcano in British Columbia, Canada
 Ruby Mountains, a mountain range in Nevada
 Ruby Dome, the highest peak of the Ruby Mountains
 Ruby Ridge, Idaho, site of a violent confrontation and siege
 Ruby Valley, Nevada
 Ruby City (disambiguation), several US ghost towns

Arts and entertainment

Fictional characters
 Ruby Allen, EastEnders character played by Louisa Lytton
 Ruby Buckton, Home and Away character played by Rebecca Breeds
 Ruby Crescent, an O-Parts Hunter character
 Ruby Dennis, the protagonist of the film Dear Mr. Wonderful
 Ruby Kurosawa, a fictional character from the media-mix project Love Live! Sunshine!!
 Ruby Moon, a character from Cardcaptor Sakura manga and anime
 Ruby Ramirez, a character from Rusty Rivets
 Ruby Marshall, a character from the TV series Dot.
 Ruby Rhod, a character in the film The Fifth Element
 Ruby Rose (RWBY character), the protagonist of the animated web-series RWBY
 Ruby Thewes, a character in the novel Cold Mountain by Charles Frazier and in the film
 Ruby Trollman, a Trollz character
 Ruby, one of the identical twins in the Jacqueline Wilson novel Double Act
 Ruby (Jewelpet)
 Ruby (Pokémon)
 Ruby (Once Upon a Time) (better known as Red Riding Hood), a character from the ABC television series Once Upon a Time
 Ruby (Steven Universe)
 Ruby (Supernatural)
 Ruby (The Land Before Time)
 Ruby, an According to Jim character
 Ruby, a promotional character created by ATI Technologies
 Ruby, a rabbit in the Max & Ruby book and television series
 Ruby, the protagonist of the radio drama Ruby the Galactic Gumshoe
 Ruby, the protagonist of the TV series Ruby Gloom
 Ruby, a fictional potato in the British animated series Small Potatoes
 Ruby, a mouse in the British children's series Big & Small

Films
 Ruby (1977 film), a supernatural horror
 Ruby (1992 film), about Jack Ruby

Games
 Pokémon Ruby, released in 2002 for Japan and 2003 internationally
 Pokémon Omega Ruby, a remake of Pokémon Ruby

Television
 Ruby (talk show), a British late night talk show
 Ruby (2008 TV series), a Style Network program
 Ruby (2012 TV series), an Arab dramatic series
 Ruby Gallagher, a character of the ABC Family TV series Ruby & The Rockits
 The Ruby, the diner in Canadian series Corner Gas, as well as the film and animated versions

Literature
 Ruby (novel), a 1994 novel by V. C. Andrews

Music

Albums
 Ruby (The Killjoys album), 1990
 Ruby (Macy Gray album), 2018
 Ruby (Ruby album), 1976
 Ruby (Sirsy album), 2004
 Ruby (Archie Roach, Ruby Hunter, Paul Grabowsky and Australian Art Orchestra album), 2005
 The Ruby, an EP by April, 2018

Songs
 "Ruby" (Ruby Gentry theme), from the 1952 film Ruby Gentry, also performed by Ray Charles in 1960
 "Ruby" (Kaiser Chiefs song), by Kaiser Chiefs, from the album Yours Truly, Angry Mob
 "Ruby", a song by Janis Ian, from the album Revenge
 "Ruby", a song by Kristin Hersh, from the album Sunny Border Blue
 "Ruby", a song by Queenadreena, from the album Djin
 "Ruby", a song by Twenty One Pilots
 "Ruby", a song by Boyzone, from the album Brother
 "Ruby", a song by Camille, from the album Le Sac des Filles

Artists and record labels
Ruby (British band), an alternative group formed in 1994
 Ruby & the Romantics, an American R&B group
 Ruby Records, a record label
Ruby (American band), an American rock band featuring Tom Fogerty
 Ruby (Egyptian singer) (born 1981), singer and actress
 Ruby, a performer in the English hip pop quintet KING
 Ruby Frost, New Zealand singer

People
 Ruby (given name)
 Ruby (surname)
 Ruby (actress) (born 1972), American pornographic actress

Programming
 Ruby (hardware description language)
 Ruby (programming language)
 Ruby, an early development name for Visual Basic (classic)
 Ruby MRI, the C reference implementation of the Ruby language

Ships
, several vessels of the Royal Navy
, several paddle steamers
,  a converted yacht in service with the US Navy
, several merchant ships

Other uses
 Ruby (annotation), small-print pronunciation guide for logographic writing
 Ruby (car), an inter-war French manufacturer of light cars and proprietary engines
 Ruby (typography), the British English form of agate-size type
 Ruby (color), a color based on that of the gemstone
 Ruby chocolate
 Ruby (mango), a deep-red mango fruit
 'Ruby Red' and 'Star Ruby', varieties of grapefruit
 Ruby (elephant)
 Rubies (Super Fours), a women's cricket team that competed in the Super Fours
 Project Ruby, a 1946 joint Anglo-American program to test a range of bunker-buster bombs
 Brazilian ruby, Clytolaema rubricauda, a species of hummingbird
 Little Ruby, a common name of Alternanthera dentata in the amaranth family
 Ruby Leaf, a common name of Alternanthera brasiliana
 J.W. Ruby Memorial Hospital, or Ruby, in Morgantown, West Virginia
 Ruby Tuesday (restaurant), an international restaurant chain.
 List of storms named Ruby

See also
 
 
 Rubygate, a sex scandal involving Silvio Berlusconi
 Ruby pistol
 Rubi (disambiguation)
 Rubin (disambiguation)
 Rubis (rocket), a rocket system
 RWBY, an animated web series